A. N. Myer Secondary School is a public high school located in Niagara Falls, Ontario, Canada. It is located on O'Neil Street, and is part of the District School Board of Niagara. As of the 2019-2020 school year, 1213 students were enrolled  A. N. Myer was one of the first schools in the Niagara Region to receive an astroturf field in recent years. It is the only high school in the city of Niagara Falls to offer the French immersion program.

History
A. N. Myer was named after Andrew Nicholas Myer, who was principal of Stamford Collegiate from 1908 to 1933. He lived in Chippawa, near Niagara, until his death in 1963. A. N. Myer Secondary School opened on September 3, 1957. An official opening ceremony was held nearly 2 months later on October 25, 1957.

Athletics

Curling 
The A. N. Myer Boys' curling team in 2016-2017 consisted of Tyler Mills, Nicholas Vadacchino, Michael Huang, Sourena Noori, and Victor Pietrangelo. The team went undefeated in their journey to OFSAA, held in North Bay, Ontario, before winning every single game.

Football 
From 2014 to 2016, the senior boys football team won 3 straight OFSAA championships. Along with the OFSAA championship in 2016, the team also finished the season ranked 2nd in Canada, and finished those past 3 seasons with a combined record of 24-1. 11 players from the 2016 "Dream Team" went on to play to football in the Ontario University Athletics League (OUA). Those players were Joshua Lisi (University of Toronto), Noah Spadafora (Queens University), Tyler Scholz (University of Guelph), Jacob Andrews and Rico Charbonneau (Western University), Tre Ford, Tyrell Ford, Rushon Dagelman, Dallas Bone, Donovan Vanegas, and Sean DeGaust (University of Waterloo).

The Junior team has also enjoyed major success over the past several years, and as the case with the seniors as well, have won multiple zone and divisional (Niagara Bowl) titles. Although one of the most notable successes was in 2013, when they won the Junior Metrobowl. The seniors have made dominant runs to the past 4 Niagara Bowls (public school board champion vs catholic school board champion), but they've come up short in all 4 finals. 3 at the hands of Notre Dame College School in 2017, 2019, and 2021 and 1 at the hands of St Paul Catholic High School in 2018. Those 3 teams would all end up making runs to OFSAA. The juniors have also made recent runs to the Niagara bowl in 2017, 2018, and 2021. They came up short in 2018 and 2021 to Notre Dame College School, but in 2017 they defeated Blessed Trinity Catholic Secondary School, and ended up advancing all the way to the Junior Metrobowl semifinals, where they came up short to Lorne Park Secondary School.

Notable alumni
John MacBain, finance mogul and philanthropist
Jay Triano, former Canadian professional basketball player who competed in 2 Olympics under the Canadian flag and has served as the head coach twice. Currently an assistant coach with the Sacramento Kings, formerly the head coach of the Toronto Raptors.
Greg Newton, former Duke basketball player and a member of Team Canada at the 2000 Summer Olympics. He was the captain of the Duke Blue Devils men's basketball team in his senior year in 1997.
Jon Klassen, author and illustrator
Tre Ford, CFL player with the Edmonton Elks
Tyrell Ford, NFL player with the Green Bay Packers
Mary Ellen Turpel-Lafond, Canadian lawyer, judge, children's rights advocate, and recipient of the Order of Canada
Tim Hicks, country singer-song writer

References

High schools in the Regional Municipality of Niagara
1957 establishments in Canada
Educational institutions established in 1957